Sambas is a town and the regency seat of Sambas Regency (Kabupaten Sambas), on the island of Borneo. Sambas Regency is one of the regencies of West Kalimantan province in Indonesia.

Geography 
Sambas town is located between 1°11'20" and 1°24'48" north latitude and between 109°09'16" and 109°26'23" east longitude. The town district had 57,300 inhabitants at the 2020 Census.

The following are the boundaries of Sambas town:

Climate
Sambas has a tropical rainforest climate (Af) with heavy to very heavy rainfall year-round.

Gallery

References

External links 
 Official website
 http://database.kalbarprov.go.id/_wilayah/wilayah_kab.php?61.01
 http://sambas.go.id/images/files/Kec.%20Sambas.jpg
 http://humassambas.com/kecamatan/sambas/

Populated places in West Kalimantan
Port cities and towns in Indonesia
Regency seats of West Kalimantan